Holand is a village located on the northern shore of the lake Sandsjøen in the Nordli area of the municipality of Lierne in Trøndelag county, Norway.

References

Villages in Trøndelag
Lierne